Leviticus 18 (the eighteenth chapter of the Book of Leviticus) deals with a number of sexual activities considered abominable, including incest, bestiality, and sodomy. The chapter also condemns Moloch worship.

Text 
The oldest extant versions of the text in Hebrew are found in the Dead Sea Scrolls, the Samaritan Pentateuch, and the Masoretic Text. An ancient Greek translation from the third century BCE, the Septuagint, also exists. Since the addition of chapter divisions in the thirteenth century CE, this chapter is divided into 30 verses.

The chapter begins with God speaking to Moses (verse 1) and giving him a message for the Israelites (2), warning them to keep God's laws rather than Canaanite or Egyptian practices (3–5). Then God is quoted as listing people with whom sex is forbidden due to family relationships (6–19). In verse 20, God prohibits sexual relations with a neighbor's wife, and in verse 21 God prohibits passing one's children through fire to Moloch. Verse 22 is the famous verse about "lie with a man," discussed below, while in verse 23 God forbids bestiality, and according to some translations, paedophilia. In the final verses (24–30) God warns that breaking these laws will produce defilement and that the Canaanites are about to be displaced from the land of Canaan as a result of following these practices, and warn of a similar fate for the Israelites if they fall into these practices.

Incest 

The Bible lists several types of relationship which it regards as incestuous unions; one list appears in the Deuteronomic Code, and two lists occur in the Holiness Code of Leviticus. These lists only mention relationships with female relatives; excluding lesbianism, which implies that the list is addressed to men. These lists then compare as follows:

One feature of all the lists is that sexual activity between a man and his daughter is not explicitly forbidden. The Talmud argues that this is because the prohibition was obvious, especially given the proscription against a relationship with a granddaughter. The shortness of the list in Leviticus 20, and especially of that in Deuteronomy, is explained by classical Jewish scholarship as being due to the obviousness of the missing prohibitions. The explicit prohibition against engaging in sexual activity with "both a woman and her daughter" implicitly forbids sexual activity between a man and his daughter, as does the prohibition against engaging in sexual activity with "any that is near of kin". Some biblical scholars have instead proposed that it was originally in the list but was then accidentally left out from the copy on which modern versions of the text ultimately depend, due to a mistake by the scribe.

However, most tribal nations also disliked exogamous marriage to completely unrelated people. In several prominent cases in the Torah, the incest rules are ignored in favour of marriage to a close relative; Abraham married his half-sister Sarah, Jacob married his first wife's sister (albeit without his knowledge), and Amram married his paternal aunt Jochebed.

Apart from the questionable case of a man marrying his daughter, the list in Leviticus 18 roughly produces the same rules as were followed in early pre-Islamic Arabic culture.

Homosexuality 

Leviticus 18:22 in the Hebrew Bible (text: Westminster Leningrad Codex (WLC):

 See also Textual variants in the Hebrew Bible § Leviticus 18
A word-by-word analysis of the WLC Hebrew text of Leviticus 18:22:

†Note: The word  (miš-kə-ḇê) is the construct form of the masculine noun  (miš-kaḇ), which in turn comes from the verb  (šā-ḵaḇ), meaning to lie [down]. The noun  (miš-kaḇ) is defined as both a physical place of lying-down (i.e. bed, couch, bier) and the act of lying-down (i.e. sleep, intercourse). Of those 46, the KJV translates  (miš-kaḇ) to "bed" 34 times, "bedchamber" 4 times, "couch" 1 time, and miscellaneous verb forms of "lying" 7 times. Therefore,  (miš-kə-ḇê ’iš-šāh) can mean either "the bed of a woman" or "the lying-down of a woman" ["the sex/partner belonging to a woman"].

In ancient Greek translations of the Hebrew Bible, generally known as Septuagint, which serve as important references to trace the original form and meaning of the text, Leviticus 18:22 is usually rendered as follows:

Leviticus 18:22 has been translated in common English versions as:

The Hebrew wording of Leviticus 18:22 has been generally interpreted as prohibiting some or all homosexual acts, although which precise acts, and in which situations, is a matter of ongoing scholarly debate. Some authors state that verse 22 condemns "homosexuality" or "homosexual relations" and other authors maintaining that it condemns only males penetrating males (anal intercourse).  Others believe due to study of the language used in the original Hebrew, that the restriction is only relevant in specific situations (in the context idolatry, religious sacrifice or various forms of rape which were common Canaanite or Egyptian practices), and specifically does not apply to modern homosexual relationships. Some researchers speculate that the contents of the text changed over time, where earlier examples would only admonish homosexual incest, and not homosexuality, more broadly in line with surrounding attitudes at the time. Such readings have also been responded to and countered in research.

Lesbianism is not explicitly prohibited in the Torah; however, the rabbi and Jewish scholar Maimonides ruled that lesbianism was prohibited nonetheless as an "Egyptian practice" and deserving of punishment by beating.

Weekly Torah portion 
The whole chapter is part of the weekly Torah portion (parashah) Acharei Mot which comprises .

References

Bibliography

Further reading 

 Other translations can be viewed at Bible Gateway.
 Matthew Henry's Commentary on Lev 18 (18th Century)
 Acharei Mot (Jewish weekly Torah portion that includes Leviticus 18)
 Hebrew phrasing for Lev 18.
 The Great Books, for NRSV text.
 Blue Letter Bible's Bible Lookup Tools were used to derive passage citations.
 Robert Jamieson's Commentary on Lev 18. (19th Century) (conservative).
 Pharsea's treatment of Leviticus 18:22. (balanced)
 ReligiousTolerance.org's treatment of Leviticus 18:22. (liberal)

External links 
 Jewish translations:
 Vayikra - Leviticus - Chapter 18 (Judaica Press). Hebrew text and English translation [with Rashi's commentary] at Chabad.org
 Christian translations:
 Online Bible at GospelHall.org (ESV, KJV, Darby, American Standard Version, Bible in Basic English)
 Leviticus chapter 18. Bible Gateway

18
Bible-related controversies
Jewish marital law
Judaism-related controversies
LGBT and Judaism
Sexuality in the Bible